The Boteti Regional Football Association Division One League, also known as the BORFA Division One, is one of the regional leagues that make up the third tier of Botswana football. It is administered by the Boteti Regional Football Association and features teams from Boteti region.

Sponsorship
In 2019 the league secured a two-year sponsorship from Lucara Botswana, making Boteti Division One the first Botswana Division One league to be sponsored. Below is a list of all the sponsors to date:
2019-2021: Lucara

Past seasons

References

Football leagues in Botswana